Benjamin Gilkes (16 March 1893 – December 1967) was a Barbadian cricketer. He played in four first-class matches for the Barbados cricket team from 1919 to 1930.

See also
 List of Barbadian representative cricketers

References

External links
 

1893 births
1967 deaths
Barbadian cricketers
Barbados cricketers